The Associated Publishers was a producer of printed materials, founded by historian Carter G Woodson in 1920. The publishing company was founded to initially help Woodson produce his own works and helped many other scholars of black history deliver their works to the public.

History 

After World War I, Woodson sensed a desire in the African-American community to know more about their past. Because the major publishing companies at the time showed no interest for producing serious works on this topic, Woodson organized The Associated Publishers in November 1920. It was conceived as a funding resource for the Association for the Study of African American Life and History.

The company produced more than 200 books, covering wide swaths of African American life and history. Many were of a formal, footnoted nature, written by recognized authorities in historical scholarship. The company published several collections of short stories, primarily for young readers, with an emphasis on important people and events. Other titles included poetry, drama, and athletic sports.

The company published a variety of materials, including monographs, translations of the works of reputable foreign scholars, pictures, and even calendars.

The Associated Publishers closed its doors in 2005.

Contributing authors and illustrators 

 Horace Mann Bond – author
 Maud Cuney-Hare – author
 W. Montague Cobb – author
 Paul Laurence Dunbar – author
 Lois Mailou Jones – illustrator
 Robert T. Kerlin – author
 Frank J. Klingberg – author
 Kelly Miller – author
 James A. Porter – illustrator
 Alrutheus Ambush Taylor, Ph.D. – author

Significant publications 

Some of the more significant publications that were produced between 1920 and 2005:
 The Mis-Education of the Negro
 
 The History of the Negro Church, Dr. C.G. Woodson, 1921
 The Everlasting Stain, Kelley Miller, 1924
 Negro Orators and Their Orations, Dr. C.G. Woodson (Ed.), 1926
 Negro Makers of History, Dr. C.G. Woodson, 1928
 African Myths Together with Proverbs, Dr. C.G. Woodson, 1928
 The Negro as a Businessman, Dr. C.G. Woodson, 1929
 The Story of the Negro Retold, Dr. C.G. Woodson, 1935
 Negro Musicians and Their Music by Maud Cuney-Hare, 1936
 African Heroes and Heroines, Dr. C.G. Woodson, 1939
 Richard Allen: An Apostle of Freedom by Charles Wesley, 1969
 Robert S. Duncanson, 19th Century Black Romantic Painter by James Dallas Parks, 1980
 Walking Proud: The Story of Dr. Carter Godwin Woodson by Sister M. Anthony Scally, RSM, 1983

References 

Organizations established in 1922

African-American history between emancipation and the civil rights movement
Book publishing companies of the United States
Defunct book publishing companies of the United States